Wineglass is a census-designated place in Park County, Montana, United States. Its population was 256 as of the 2010 census.

Demographics

References

Census-designated places in Park County, Montana
Census-designated places in Montana